The Church of the Assumption at 528 N. 5th Avenue in Pocatello, Idaho, also known as the Hellenic Orthodox Church, is a Byzantine Revival-style building constructed in 1915.  It was added to the National Register in 1979.

It was then the older of the only two Hellenic Orthodox churches in Idaho.  Pocotello architect Charles B. Onderdonk was involved in its design or construction;  Onderdonk is also associated with the Peery Hotel in Salt Lake City, Utah.

References

External links

Official church website

Greek Orthodox churches in the United States
Churches on the National Register of Historic Places in Idaho
Churches completed in 1915
Buildings and structures in Bannock County, Idaho
1915 establishments in Idaho
National Register of Historic Places in Bannock County, Idaho
Churches in Pocatello, Idaho